Ze Vemixes is the remix album to Van She's debut studio album, V. It was released on 12 June 2009 in Australia as a 2-disc CD with the original version of the album on the first disc. All of the tracks are remixes by the band's offshoot Van She Technologic.

Track listing
 "Changes" (Van She Tech Remix) – 5:55 
 "Talkin'" (Van She Tech Remix) – 3:44 
 "Strangers" (Ze Vemixes Remix) – 4:54 
 "It Could Be the Same" (Van She Tech Remix) – 5:13 
 "Sexual City" (Van She Tech Remix) – 6:16 
 "The Cat & The Eye" (Ze Vemixes Remix) – 4:10 
 "Techno Music" (Van She Tech Remix) – 4:22 
 "Virgin Suicide" (Acoustic Mix) – 3:30

2009 remix albums
Van She albums
Modular Recordings remix albums